from Niigata was a Japanese author. He wrote a number of historical novels. Politician Kenji Yamaoka is an adopted son. In 1968, he won the Yoshikawa Eiji Prize for his historical novel Tokugawa Ieyasu.

Awards
 1958 - Chunichi Prize
 1967 - Shin Hasegawa Prize
 1968 - Yoshikawa Eiji Prize
 1973- Medal with Purple Ribbon
 1978 - 2nd Class, Order of the Sacred Treasure

Selected published works
 Otoko no Koi (1938)
 Marshall Yamamoto Isoroku (1944)
 Young Chiba Shusaku (1955)
 Chiba Shūsaku  (1952-54)
 Tokugawa Ieyasu (1953-67) - 28 volumes
 Oda Nobunaga (1955-60) - 8 volumes
 Young Oda Nobunaga (1965)
 Yamada Nagamasa (1956)
 Sakamoto Ryōma (1956)
 Mito Kōmon (1957)
 Minamoto no Yoritomo (1957-60) - 3 volumes
 Shin Taiheiki (1957-62) - 8 volumes
 Nobusuke Kishi (1959)
 Ikiteita Mitsuhide (1963)
 Yagyū clan (1964)
 Mōri Motonari (1964)
 Isehon Taikoki (1965) - 7 volumes
 Pacific War (1965-71) - 9 volumes
 Takasugi Shinsaku (1966)
 Yoshida Shōin (1968)
 Emperor Meiji (1968) - 3 volumes
 Date Masamune (1970-73)
 Haru no Sakamichi (1971)
 Tokugawa Yoshinobu (1974) - 5 volumes
 Tokugawa Iemitsu  (1974-76) - 3 volumes
 Unprecedented Man - Ryōichi Sasakawa (1978)

Adaptations

Television
 Haru no Sakamichi (1971)
 Tokugawa Ieyasu (1983)
 Dokuganryū Masamune (1987)

Film
 Kurenaigao no Wakamusha (1955)Oda Nobunaga, a Toei production
 Fuunji Oda Nobunaga (1959), a Toei production
 Tokugawa Ieyasu'' (1965), a Toei production

References

1907 births
1978 deaths
20th-century Japanese novelists